Eastwood High School is a public high school in the Ysleta Independent School District the city of El Paso, Texas, United States.

History 
Eastwood High School, "Home of El Paso's Finest," is located in the city of El Paso, Texas. Eastwood opened in the Fall of 1961 and had its first graduating senior class in 1965.  Today Eastwood High School has 400+ graduates annually. The school is in the Ysleta Independent School District. In 1976, Eastwood High School Troopers won the Class 4A (now 6A) State Championship in basketball as the underdog of the state tourney, as of 2015 the feat has yet to be repeated by any other El Paso basketball team.

The famed Trooper mascot is based on the Union Cavalry Soldiers during the American Civil War. Both the school and the cavalry units share the blue and gold color scheme.  
 
In 2013 the Texas UIL changed the realignments. As of 2014 Eastwood High School is now in the UIL 6A division and the only 6A high school in the Ysleta Independent School District.

After the passage of a district wide renovation bond, the original 1965 Eastwood building was torn down and is being replaced with a state of the art new 21st century school building. The cost of the building is estimated at $93 million and is set to be completed in August 2019. As a result of the reconstruction and decrease in capacity, Eastwood has seen a reduction in student population and will be realigned to compete in the 5-A U.I.L Division for 2018–2020.

Extracurricular activities

Clubs
Reveille - Eastwood's literary magazine
Sabre- Eastwood News Outlet
JROTC
City recognized marching band
Jazz bands
Winterguard
Student Council
Rachel's Challenge
Speech and Debate
Drama Club (associated with International Thespian Society)
String Orchestra
Youth For Christ
Fellowship of Christian Athletes - Known for its dodgeball tournaments
Gay Straight Alliance (GSA) Club
Math and Science U.I.L. Teams
Astronomy Club
National Honors Society 
National Science Honors Society
Rho Kappa Society
Mock Trial
Chick-Fil-A Leader Academy
Motivation Speaks
Art Club
Science Fair Club
CB Club
EHS Skate Club
Video Technology Club
Photo Journalism
Chess Club
Glee Club
Car Club
DECA
Future Business Leaders of America (FBLA)
Eastwood High School is home to the largest chapter of FBLA in West Texas. In 2017-2018 both the TX FBLA State President and National FBLA VP were EHS Students. This chapter is also home to a former Texas Advisor of the Year and its members hold many state championships. The chapter's largest feat is its unbroken, nine consecutive years of state officers as of 2022.
HI-Q (Quiz Bowl Team)

Teams
El Paso's Finest Speech and Debate Team
The speech and debate team at Eastwood High School has evolved into a powerhouse, winning sweepstakes awards at numerous Texas Forensics Association Tournaments. 
Army JROTC
JROTC Honor Guard
JROTC Armed Drill Team
JROTC Unarmed Drill Team
JROTC Cadet Challenge- male& female
JROTC Color Guard- [male, female & mixed]
JROTC Orienteering
JROTC Rifle Team
Trooperettes
Eastwood Robotics Team
VEX Multi-time World Qualifying team 
Cavaliers: Eastwood Varsity Choir
Eastwood Marching Band
Eastwood Varsity Guitar
Eastwood Orchestra
High Q 
Saltatrix
Iconic
Folklorico
Recognized on the city, state, regional, and national level
Flags
Musical Theatre
Cappies Student Critique Program
UIL Academic Teams
The Eastwood UIL Academic team structure is decentralized, with many coaches for various subjects including History, Current Events, Mathematics, Theatre, and Literature.

Sports

Boys
Baseball
Basketball
Won the Texas 4A State Championship in 1976
Cheerleading
Cross Country
 Won the Texas 5A State Championship in 2018 and 2019
Football
Golf
Gymnastics
Soccer
Swimming
On a current streak of 30+ consecutive district titles
Tennis
Track and field
Wrestling

Girls
Basketball
Cheerleading
Cross Country
Golf
Gymnastics
Saltatrix
Soccer
Softball
Swimming
Tennis
Track and Field
Trooperettes
Volleyball
Wrestling 
UIL 2020 5A State Champions

Notable alumni
Jack Handey - best known for his Deep Thoughts segments on Saturday Night Live.
Butch Henry - former Major League pitcher.
Frank Castillo - former Major League Baseball pitcher.
Eric Jack (Class of 1990)- former National Football League defensive back. Atlanta Falcons, University of New Mexico
Cesar J. Blanco - Texas State Senator representing district 29. Former member of the Texas House of Representatives from the 76th district (2015 - 2021).

References

External links
 

Ysleta Independent School District high schools
High schools in El Paso, Texas